Star Valley is located in the United States between the Salt River Range in western Wyoming and the Webster Range of eastern Idaho. Three major Wyoming rivers, the Salt River, the Greys River and the Snake River meet near Alpine Junction at Palisades Reservoir. Numerous towns are located in the valley, including Afton, Thayne, Bedford, Etna, Smoot, Fairview, Osmond, Freedom, Grover, Auburn, Alpine, Nordic, Turnerville and Star Valley Ranch. Star Valley was settled in the late 1870s by Mormon pioneers. Primary sources indicate Star Valley was proclaimed the "Star of All Valleys" for its natural beauty by a general authority of the Church of Jesus Christ of Latter-day Saints (LDS Church). The name was later shortened to Star Valley. Another less supported theory about the origin of the name comes from Starvation (Starve) Valley, a name the area gained during bitter winters in the late 1880s.

History 

Star Valley was inhabited mainly by Shoshone Indians in the summer and fall months until the early 19th century. The natives were drawn to the valley for its abundant game and the pure salt deposits found near the present town of Auburn and also to the south of Afton, Wyoming there are more renowned salt deposits.

American explorers are known to have traveled through the area as early as 1812, seeking new routes to the West Coast. Canadian and American trappers followed, frequenting the area through the 1840s. The 1850s and 1860s saw many emigrants passing through the upper Star Valley area via the Lander Road on the Oregon Trail. White settlement of the area did not begin in earnest, though, until the late 1870s when LDS Apostles Moses Thatcher and Brigham Young, Jr. chose the valley for colonization. Archibald Gardner and members of his extended family arrived in 1889, building and operating five mills of various types in the valley.

On October 1, 2011, Thomas S. Monson, president of the LDS Church, announced in General Conference that the Star Valley Wyoming Temple would be built in the valley. The location was announced on May 25, 2012, to be just east of U.S. Highway 89 on the Haderlie Farm property just south of Afton. The temple was completed and dedicated on October 30, 2016, by LDS Apostle David A. Bednar, the 154th dedicated temple in operation.

Communities 

Afton
Alpine
Auburn
Bedford
Etna
Freedom
Grover
Thayne
Smoot
Star Valley Ranch

See also
Intermittent Spring (Wyoming)
Swift Creek (Wyoming)

Notes

External links
 Star Valley Wyoming Community Website
 Lincoln County Govt Website

Landforms of Lincoln County, Wyoming
Rocky Mountains
Valleys of Wyoming